Dario Stefano (born 2 August 1963) is an Italian politician. Graduated in Economy, Stefano has been a member of the Apulian division of the General Confederation of Italian Industry and taught Economics and Industrial Accounting at the University of Salento.

Biography 
After the 2005 Apulian regional elections, Stefano has been elected regional councilor with The Daisy, supporting the centre-left candidate Nichi Vendola, who is elected governor. In 2009, he is appointed by Vendola himself Councilor for Agri-food Resources.

He is later reconfirmed in the Apulian Regional Assembly after the 2010 regional elections as leader of the political association La Puglia in Più and is reappointed Councilor for Agri-food Resources in the second Vendola's junta.

During the 2013 elections, La Puglia in Più makes a political agreement with Vendola's Left Ecology Freedom, and Stefano is elected senator as independent in the SEL list.

On 5 June 2013, Stefano is appointed president of the Junta for the Elections, Authorizations and Immunities of the Senate: the junta has been later appointed to deliberate about Silvio Berlusconi's senatorial decadence.

On 18 July 2014, Stefano candidates for the centre-left primaries to choose Vendola's successor as gubernatorial candidate, together with the former mayor of Bari Michele Emiliano and the former mayor of Molfetta Guglielmo Minervini, both from the Democratic Party. During the primaries, Stefano received support from Vendola himself, from actress Helen Mirren and director Taylor Hackford, owners of a house in Apulia. Stefano manages to reach the second place, being defeated by Emiliano, who will be later elected governor after the 2015 regional elections.

In 2017, Stefano doesn't join the new Italian Left party and, with the 2018 elections, is re-elected senator with the Democratic Party.

References

External links 
Official website
Files about his parliamentary activities (in Italian): XVII, XVIII legislature.

1963 births
Living people
Democratic Party (Italy) politicians
21st-century Italian politicians
20th-century Italian people